Darrell Fitzgerald D'Silva (born 5 January 1964) is a British film and theatre actor, notable for his work with the Royal Shakespeare Company.

Early life and education 
D'Silva was born in Rotherham, South Yorkshire. He is of Portuguese, Greek, French, Dutch and English background, the son of Earle D'Silva, a glass factory worker and Jackie Haig, a hairdresser. D'Silva was part of the 1980s' Sheffield music scene, playing with The Anti-Group Group and Hula before becoming an actor. He graduated from the Drama Centre London.

Career
D'Silva first joined the RSC in 1996 to play Kilroy in Steven Pimlott's production of Tennessee Williams's Camino Real. He has appeared in plays with the company for over 20 years and was made Associate Artist in 2011. He has toured the world with the RSC and was nominated for The Washington Post Helen Hayes Award for most Outstanding Performance for his role as Siward in Dunsinane by David Greig. His work at the Royal National Theatre includes The Rose Tattoo, The Royal Hunt of the Sun and Closer.

He also starred in a series of short films. Show Pieces was written by Alan Moore and directed by Mitch Jenkins; Jimmy's End and His Heavy Heart were written by Moore as introduction sections to a much larger project planned by Moore & Jenkins called The Show.

In 2006, he played Johann Lindeman, captain of the Gouverneur Generaal Loudon, a ship that survived the 1883 explosion of Krakatoa in the BBC docu-drama Krakatoa: The Last Days. In 2015, he played Max Scullion in Father Brown episode 3.5 "The Last Man" and in 2016 he played Geoff Craven in Endeavour episode 3.3 "Prey" and an Ironborn in the HBO series Game of Thrones in season 6. In 2018, he appeared in three episodes of the six-episode BBC drama miniseries Informer. From 2020 to the present, D'Silva stars as pathologist Hendrik Davie in Company Pictures relaunch of Van Der Valk. In 2021, he played the part of Mike in Guy Ritchie's action thriller Wrath of Man, starring Jason Statham. In the same year, he acted as Piso in the TV series Domina.

External links 
 

Living people
1964 births
British male stage actors
British male film actors
Actors from Rotherham
Male actors from Yorkshire
Alumni of the Drama Centre London
English people of Portuguese descent
English people of Italian descent
English people of Dutch descent
English people of Greek descent
English people of French descent